Ali Gane is a small town in western-central Senegal. It is located in the Kaolack Region.

Nearby towns and villages include Gama (2.2 nm), Moukhoume (2.2 nm), Ndiayene Bagana (1.0 nm), Guissam (1.4 nm), Kebe Keur Babou (1.4 nm), Medina Diognik (1.4 nm) and Loumene (1.4 nm).

References

External links
Satellite map at Maplandia.com

Populated places in Kaolack Region